is a Japanese shōjo manga artist. She is best known for her manga GALS!, which was published in Ribon magazine, and adapted into an anime television series under the name Super GALS! Kotobuki Ran. Her debut work was Mujaki na mama de, published in the 1990 autumn issue of Ribon Original. In 2006, she created Tokyo Angels which ran in Margaret throughout that year.

In 2019, she revived Gals! on the MangaMee app and confirmed that it is a continuation.

Works

References

External links
    
  
 

Women manga artists
Living people
1974 births
Manga artists from Tokyo
Japanese female comics artists
Female comics writers
20th-century Japanese women writers
21st-century Japanese women writers